Sir Timothy Peter Geoffrey Kitson (28 January 1931 – 18 May 2019) was a British Conservative politician who was Member of Parliament for Richmond, North Yorkshire.  He was first elected at the 1959 general election, and stood down at the 1983 general election.

Kitson was the son of Geoffrey H. and Kathleen Kitson. He was educated at Charterhouse and the Royal Agricultural College, Cirencester. He farmed in Australia from 1949 to 1951. From 1954 to 1957, he served as a councillor on Thirsk Rural District Council, and from 1957 to 1961 on North Riding County Council. In Parliament, he acted as joint honorary secretary of the Conservative parliamentary committee on agriculture, fisheries and food from 1965 to 1966 and a Parliamentary Private Secretary to the then Prime Minister Edward Heath from 1970 to 1974.

In 1964 and 1965, Kitson supported the Labour MP Sydney Silverman's successful 'Murder (Abolition of Death Penalty) Bill'. He opposed abolition in the form finalised in 1969, however. Kitson received a knighthood in Heath's resignation honours list in 1974.

The droll side of his personality was caught in an anecdote told by Heath in his autobiography. Heath had friendly relations with the Singapore politician, Lee Kuan Yew ['Harry' Lee]: "Whenever I have visited Singapore, except for the 1971 Commonwealth Conference, Harry Lee has generously settled me in his personal guest-house, and extended his hospitality to me. His dinners are marked by an invitation card and a menu with 'Smoking is not permitted' heavily printed at the top. Dining with the Lee family one time outside in his garden, I was alarmed when the butler came up to Sir Timothy Kitson, my parliamentary private secretary, and handed him a note. After reading it, Tim apologised to the Prime Minister [Lee Kuan Yew] and asked to be excused while he made a telephone call to London. He returned after some twenty minutes, but half an hour later the same thing happened. Again Tim came back without a word of explanation. When we got up after dinner, I quietly went up to him and said, 'Tim, what was all that about ? Is something wrong ? What is happening in London?' 'I didn't worry you because everything is perfectly all right,' he replied. 'I just had to have a smoke.'"

Personal life
Kitson married Diana Mary Fattorini in 1959; the couple had two daughters and one son. He died on 18 May 2019, aged 88.

References

External links 
 

1931 births
2019 deaths
People educated at Charterhouse School
Conservative Party (UK) MPs for English constituencies
Members of North Riding County Council
Parliamentary Private Secretaries to the Prime Minister
UK MPs 1959–1964
UK MPs 1964–1966
UK MPs 1966–1970
UK MPs 1970–1974
UK MPs 1974
UK MPs 1974–1979
UK MPs 1979–1983
Alumni of the Royal Agricultural University
Knights Bachelor